Van Buren State Park is a public recreation area surrounding   Van Buren Lake in Hancock County, Ohio, in the United States. The state park covers  abutting the southern boundary of the village of Van Buren and offers fishing, boating, camping, hiking, and other recreational activities.

History
The process of creating the park began in 1939 when a dam was built over Rocky Ford Creek creating Van Buren Lake as part of a private wildlife preserve. The lake and preserve were transferred to the state of Ohio for use as a state park in 1950.

Ecology
Van Buren State Park is in a rich agricultural area. Northwest Ohio is part of the Interior Plains region of North America. The land is largely flat with a few hills that are a remnant of the last ice age. Beneath the topsoil lies a layer of dolomitic limestone.

The park is in a small patch of woods surrounded by thousands of acres of fields of corn, wheat and soybeans. The land was largely forested before it was cleared by farmers. A small patch of woodland, made mostly of beech and sugar maple trees, remains at Van Buren State Park. Typical woodland mammals found in the park include white-tailed deer, red fox, red squirrel, skunk, and opossum. Bird species include the cowbird, woodcock, eastern bluebird, short-eared owl and eastern meadowlark. The park is also home to garter snakes and spring peepers. Wildflowers in the area include chicory, spring beauty, Dutchman's breeches, daisy fleabane and thimbleweed.

Activities and amenities
The park features boating for hand- and electric-powered water craft, trails for hikers, mountain bikers and horseback riders, and primitive, full-service and equestrian camping. Fish species found in the lake include largemouth bass, carp, bluegill, channel catfish, bullhead and crappie. Hunting is limited to bowhunting.

References

External links

Van Buren State Park Ohio Department of Natural Resources
Van Buren State Park Map Ohio Department of Natural Resources

State parks of Ohio
Protected areas of Hancock County, Ohio
Protected areas established in 1950
1950 establishments in Ohio